Teniste may refer to:

Taijo Teniste (b. 1988), Estonian footballer playing for FC Levadia Tallinn
Güngören, Anamur a village in Anamur ilçe (district) of Mersin Province, Turkey